Tresco Heliport  is a heliport located on the island of Tresco, in the Isles of Scilly off the southwest coast of England, UK. The heliport was served by a scheduled helicopter service from 1983 to 2012, and since 2020 a new scheduled service now operates from the new Penzance Heliport. Currently, Tresco Heliport offers a landing site for private and charter helicopters by private arrangement.

History 
Tresco Heliport had a CAA Ordinary Licence (Number P677) that allowed flights for the public transport of passengers or for flying instruction as authorised by the licensee. The aerodrome was not licensed for night use.

The heliport was owned and operated by Tresco Estate, who lease the island from the Duchy of Cornwall. Tresco Heliport was opened by John King, Baron King of Wartnaby, Chairman of British Airways, on 26 April 1983.

Tresco's principal industry is tourism, and the heliport supported this by enabling a scheduled helicopter service to and from the mainland. This scheduled service came to an end in 2012.

On summer weekdays the heliport received up to six flights a day from Penzance Heliport on the mainland, with two services a day in winter. Passengers were conveyed from the heliport to their resort or destination on a passenger carrying trailer drawn by a farm tractor. A footpath from one of the main landing beaches, at Carn Near, to the Abbey Gardens crosses the heliport landing field; it was closed by warning lights and bells a few minutes before a helicopter was due to land at the heliport, and opened again after the helicopter had taken off.

The heliport was officially closed on 31 October 2012 and all commercial flights ceased operations. Private and charter helicopter flights to Tresco are still welcomed by the owner, by prior arrangement.

New helicopter service from 2020 
In 2016, plans were announced for a new helicopter service between a new Penzance Heliport and the Isles of Scilly.

The service launched in March 2020 and flights now operate into both St Mary's Airport and Tresco Heliport under the name of Penzance Helicopters, operated by Sloane Helicopters.

Airlines and destinations

See also

 St Mary's Airport (Isles of Scilly)

References

External links

 

Airports in Cornwall
Heliports in England
Buildings and structures in the Isles of Scilly
Transport in the Isles of Scilly
1983 establishments in England
Tresco, Isles of Scilly